The President's Committee on Equality of Treatment and Opportunity in the Armed Services, or the Fahy Committee was formed by President Harry S Truman as part of Executive Order 9981. This committee consisted of Charles Fahy as chairman and six other members, two of whom were African-American. The committee's main purpose was to oversee successful racial integration of the US Armed Forces.

President Truman abolished the commission on July 6, 1950, on what he termed successful completion of integration in the armed forces.

Membership
The committee consisted of the following 7 members:
 Charles Fahy (chairman), former Solicitor General of the United States
 Alphonsus J. Donahue, businessowner from Connecticut
 Lester Granger, president of the National Urban League
 Charles Luckman, president of Lever Brothers
 Dwight R. G. Palmer, president of the General Cable Corporation
 John H. Sengstacke, publisher of The Chicago Defender
 William E. Stevenson, president of Oberlin College
However, Alphonsus Donahue died in July 1949 and Charles Luckman was not active in the committee, reducing the number of members who submitted the committee's final report to 5.

Report
The committee's findings were published in their final report Freedom to Serve: Equality of Treatment and Opportunity in the Armed Services on 22 May 1950. The committee argued that segregation was detrimental to the military's efficiency, in contrast to the claims of pro-segregation officials including the Secretary of the Army, Air Force, and Navy.

References

External links
 Freedom to Serve: Equality of Treatment and Opportunity in the Armed Services

Presidency of Harry S. Truman
United States Presidential Commissions